Sara González Lolo (born 17 March 1992) is a Spanish  quad hockey player. She currently captains  Club Patín Gijón Solimar.

Playing career

Lolo began playing roller hockey in 2002 when she was 10 years old. Two years later, Lolo joined Club Patín Gijón Solimar, the club she still plays with today. Lolo was named captain of the team during the 2015-2016 season.

Lolo has also competed in numerous competitions with the Spanish national team.

References

1992 births
Living people
Spanish roller skaters
Spanish sportswomen